= Shivanagar, Belagavi =

Shivanagar
- Village
- Country: India
- State: Karnataka
- District: Belagavi

Languages
  - Official: Kannada
- Time zone: UTC+5:30 (IST)

Shivanagar is a village in Belagavi district in the southern state of Karnataka, India.

The population recorded was 574 as of the 2011 census.
